is a Japanese professional footballer who plays as a centre-back or full-back for Nankatsu SC.

Career
Inoha was educated at and played for Kagoshima Jitsugyo High School and Hannan University. He was on trial with several J. League clubs before the graduation from his high school but failed to convince any club to sign him. He decided to continue his study and football at Hannan University. When he was at the university, he was a member of the Japan team that won the 23rd Universiade football competition hosted by İzmir, Turkey.

His good form in the Kansai university League was recognised by Japan's youth team coach Kiyoshi Okuma who included him in the squad for the 2005 FIFA World Youth Championship finals.

He signed with F.C. Tokyo after a successful trial and he took a leave of absence from the university with which he is still enrolled as of April 2008. Manager Alexandre Gallo immediately established him as a starting member in his midfield.

He received a call-up twice in 2006 for the national squad. Then he was a late replacement for injured Ryuji Bando for the 2007 AFC Asian Cup finals but did not play in the competition.

He was transferred to reigning J. League champions Kashima in 2008. He was a key member of the Japan's Under 23 team, however he failed to join the U-23 squad to compete the Beijing Olympics football competition.

He was included in the 2011 AFC Asian Cup finals and made his full international debut on 17 January 2011 against Saudi Arabia. In a game against Qatar, in the 2011 AFC Asian Cup, he scored a goal in minute 89' of the game. The game ended 3–2, a win for Japan.

In the summer transfer window of 2011 he moved to Croatian giant Hajduk Split. He scored his only goal for Hajduk in a 3–0 away from home victory over newly promoted side Lučko on 21 October 2011. He struggled to adapt to Croatian life, stating reasons such as difficulty to learn the new language and no other Asian players in the side as main factors. On 17 January 2012, he skipped training for the first time due to unpaid wages. The unpaid wages were due to the debt of Hajduk Split and many players were unpaid during his stay at the club. He was fined by the club for missing three training sessions before finally rescinding his contract and returning to Japan in late January 2012. He made 16 appearances in his single season for Hajduk Split. Upon leaving, Masahiko stated: "In my entire career, I have never been as sad as I was in the last two weeks."

Masahiko signed for Vissel Kobe as a free agent in early 2012. After Vissel Kobe's relegation from the top tier in Japan in 2012, Inoha then moved to Jubilo Iwata in January 2013 for an undisclosed fee. He made 25 appearances and scored a single goal in his first season for Iwata in the Japanese first division but unfortunately they finished in 17th place and were relegated. After three seasons spent in Shizuoka, he was released at the end of the 2015 season after helping Jubilo Iwata gain promotion. He signed for Vissel Kobe in February 2016.

Career statistics

Club

International

Scores and results list Japan's goal tally first, score column indicates score after each Inoha goal.

Honours
Kashima Antlers
J. League Division 1: 2008, 2009
Emperor's Cup: 2010
Japanese Super Cup: 2009, 2010

Japan
AFC Asian Cup: 2011

References

External links
 
 
 Japan National Football Team Database
 
 
 Profile at Vissel Kobe

1985 births
Living people
Hannan University alumni
Association football people from Miyazaki Prefecture
Japanese footballers
Association football defenders
Japan international footballers
Japan youth international footballers
J1 League players
J2 League players
Croatian Football League players
FC Tokyo players
Kashima Antlers players
HNK Hajduk Split players
Vissel Kobe players
Júbilo Iwata players
Yokohama FC players
2007 AFC Asian Cup players
2011 AFC Asian Cup players
2013 FIFA Confederations Cup players
2014 FIFA World Cup players
AFC Asian Cup-winning players
Japanese expatriate footballers
Japanese expatriate sportspeople in Croatia
Expatriate footballers in Croatia